was a Japanese Consul stationed in Hawaii. He received instructions on March 22, 1941, to gather information about the schedule of the American fleet at Naval Station Pearl Harbor, by bribery, if necessary. These instructions were intercepted by U.S. intelligence but did not raise alarms.

He received further instructions on September 24, 1941, to report the locations of American aircraft in bases in Hawaii. These instructions were also intercepted but did not raise alarms. The intercepted message was sent to Washington, DC by sea, not by air, and when eventually decoded, was not thought by American intelligence to be useful.

References

Japanese diplomats
World War II spies for Japan
1912 births
2000 deaths